Bhojudih is a census town in the Chandanakiyari CD block in the Chas subdivision of the Bokaro district in the state of Jharkhand, India.

Geography

Location
It has an average elevation of 138 metres (452 feet).

Area overview
Bokaro district consists of undulating uplands on the Chota Nagpur Plateau with the Damodar River cutting a valley right across. The East Bokaro Coalfield located in the Bermo-Phusro area and small intrusions of Jharia Coalfield make Bokaro a coal rich district. In 1965, one of the largest steel manufacturing units in the country, Bokaro Steel Plant, operated by Steel Authority of India Limited, was set-up at Bokaro Steel City. The Damodar Valley Corporation established its first thermal power station at Bokaro (Thermal). The soil is generally infertile and agriculture is mostly rain-fed.

Note: The map alongside presents some of the notable locations in the district. All places marked in the map are linked in the larger full screen map.

Demographics
According to the 2011 Census of India, Bhojudih had a total population of 7,005, of which 3,699 (53%) were males and 3,306 (47%) were females. Population in the age range 0–6 years was 829. The total number of literate persons in Bhojudih was 4,624 (74.87% of the population over 6 years).

According to 2001 India census, Bhojudih has a population of 8,936. Males constitute 54% of the population and females 46%. Bhojudih has an average literacy rate of 64%, higher than the national average of 59.5%; with male literacy of 75% and female literacy of 51%. 12% of the population is under 6 years of age.

Infrastructure
According to the District Census Handbook 2011, Bokaro, Bhojudih  covered an area of 3.28 km2. Among the civic amenities, it had 9 km roads with open drains, the protected water supply involved tapwater from treated sources, uncovered well, overhead tank. It had 1,330 domestic electric connections, 175 road lighting points. Among the medical facilities, it had 1 hospital, 2 dispensaries, 2 health centres, 3 family welfare centres, 4 maternity and child welfare centres, 4 maternity homes, 12 nursing homes, 4 medicine shops. Among the educational facilities it had 3 primary schools, 2 middle schools, 1 secondary school, 1 senior secondary school. Among the social, recreational and cultural facilities it had 1 stadium, 1 auditorium/ community hall. It had the branch office of 1 nationalised bank.

Economy

Washery
Bhojudih Coal Washery of Bharat Coking Coal Limited has an annual capacity of washing 1.7 million tonnes of coking coal. It was established in 1962.

There is a small market in the centre, known as 'Mini Market'. Linepar, Niche Bazar, Chattatand and Mahatha Para are other areas in Bhojudih.

Note: In the map alongside the places marked are NOT linked because collieries/ washeries do not have separate pages

Transport
Bhojudih railway station is on the Adra-Netaji SC Bose Gomoh branch line. Train is the best transport service to reach Bhojudih (BJE). It is possible to reach here by road too.

Education

Bhojudih has schooling facility up to 10+2. There is a Government School as well as a Railway School. And then there is one Graduation College, which is known as Swami Vivekananda College and it is affiliated with the S.S.College (Chas/Bokaro) and follows the guidelines of Vinoba Bhave University, Hazaribag. It is also known as Bhojudih College Bhojudih. Arts, Science and Commerce all available as subjects here.

S.E. Railway Inter College is a Hindi medium school and has all the facilities. From 2014, this school is affiliated with CBSE. Class 1 and Class 2 are now fully English medium and it will progress to other classes with this new batch of students.

There is one Saraswati Vidya Mandir too. One English medium school is known as Shishu Niketan, which is attended by small children to learn the basics of English and other subjects. English medium facility is available up to Standard 5 here.

Culture
There is a holy place here known as 'Bhairav-Sthan' (भैरवस्थान). There is a small temple of Bhairav baba where people perform traditional rituals and worship him. There is also a Pavitra Kund here in Bhairav dham which is full of clean water. It is said that Arjuna created this Kund using his Arrow during Pandvas banwaas years in Dvapara Yuga. It is found that water from this kund flows continuously but its level remains the same, even at the time of summer. Slowly, it is developing into a tourist spot.

There are other lots of religious places here. Durga Pandal (Niche Bazar), Shiv Mandir (Chhatatand), Janamashtami Pandal (Linepar) are some of the temples here. There is a Church and a Masjid too. People of all communities live in harmony here.

Like other Indian towns, Durga Puja, Ganesh Puja, Vishwakarma Puja, Saraswati Puja, Janamashtami, Diwali, Kali Puja, Muharram, Christmas and Chhat Puja are the popular festivals here.

Healthcare

There is an outdoor health clinic facility available here which is known as Railway Hospital. Also, there are at least three doctors available here. And then, there are some compounders too, who provide home services.

References

Cities and towns in Bokaro district